Rostislav Vlach (born 23 July 1962) is a former Czech professional ice hockey player. He competed for Czechoslovakia in the men's tournament at the 1988 Winter Olympics.

Career statistics

Regular season and playoffs

International

References

External links
 
 

1962 births
Czech ice hockey coaches
Czech ice hockey centres
Czechoslovak ice hockey centres
HC Dukla Jihlava players
Ice hockey players at the 1988 Winter Olympics
Living people
Los Angeles Kings draft picks
Olympic ice hockey players of Czechoslovakia
Sportspeople from Přerov
PSG Berani Zlín players
VHK Vsetín players
Czechoslovak expatriate sportspeople in Finland
Czechoslovak expatriate ice hockey people
Czech expatriate ice hockey players in Slovakia
Czech expatriate ice hockey players in Germany